Erik Mikael Slottner (born 16 April 1980) is a Swedish politician for the Christian Democrats. Since 18 October 2022 he is the Minister for Public Administration in the Ulf Kristersson cabinet. Since 2018, he is a member of the Riksdagen.

References

1980 births
Government ministers of Sweden
Living people
Members of the Riksdag from the Christian Democrats (Sweden)
Members of the Riksdag 2018–2022